Pierre Bodin (23 March 1934 – 12 December 1981) was a French footballer. He competed in the men's tournament at the 1960 Summer Olympics.

References

External links
 
 

1934 births
1981 deaths
French footballers
Olympic footballers of France
Footballers at the 1960 Summer Olympics
Association football defenders
Racing Club de France Football players